Joseph Brunet (November 26, 1834 – April 17, 1904) was a politician and businessman.

Born in St. Vincent de Paul, Lower Canada, Brunet was an alderman for Montreal for two terms between 1872 and 1877 and 1886 to 1902. He was elected to the Legislative Assembly of Quebec as a member of the Quebec Liberal Party to represent Montréal division no. 2 in the 1890 Quebec general election. He was defeated when he ran for re-election in 1892.

He was elected to the House of Commons of Canada as a Member of the Liberal Party in a by-election on January 15, 1902 to represent the riding of St. James. His election was declared void on December 22, 1902.

References
 
 

1834 births
1904 deaths
Liberal Party of Canada MPs
Members of the House of Commons of Canada from Quebec
Quebec Liberal Party MNAs